Junivan Soares de Melo (born 20 November 1977), known as just Junivan, is a retired Brazilian footballer.

Career statistics

References

External links
 Brazilian FA Database

1977 births
Living people
Brazilian footballers
Brazilian expatriate footballers
PFC Belasitsa Petrich players
PFC Lokomotiv Plovdiv players
Kayseri Erciyesspor footballers
Turan-Tovuz IK players
Expatriate footballers in Bulgaria
Expatriate footballers in Turkey
Expatriate footballers in Azerbaijan
Association football forwards
Sportspeople from Amazonas (Brazilian state)
Azerbaijan Premier League players
First Professional Football League (Bulgaria) players
Süper Lig players